Ouan is a small town and commune in the Cercle of Tominian in the Ségou Region of Mali. In 1998 the commune had a population of 9,165.

References

Communes of Ségou Region